Jacinda Barrett Macht (born 2 August 1972) is an Australian actress and former model. She first became known to audiences as a cast member on The Real World: London (1995) before appearing in films such as The Human Stain (2003), Bridget Jones: The Edge of Reason (2004), Ladder 49 (2004), The Namesake (2006), Poseidon (2006), and The Last Kiss (2006). She appeared in the series The Following in 2013 and joined the main cast of the Netflix series Bloodline, which launched in 2015.

Early life, family and education
Barrett was born in Brisbane, Queensland, Australia, the daughter of an airport firefighter. 

She attended Kenmore State High School in Brisbane. Later, in 1997, she attended a Midsummer program at the British American Drama Academy in Oxford, England.

Career
As a high school student, she won the annual Dolly Covergirl contest in Australia in 1988 and started modeling at the age of 17 throughout Europe. 

In 1995, she made her first television appearance as a cast member on MTV's The Real World: London. Her film debut was in Campfire Tales (1997). 

Barrett appeared in the September 1998 issue of Maxim, in an article promoting the new fall television series. Her appearance served to promote her appearance in the NBC primetime soap opera Wind on Water, but the show only lasted one season.

Barrett and her husband have performed together at least twice. They appeared in the film Middle Men (2009), and she had a recurring role in the second season of the TV series Suits (2012-2013), playing a love interest of her husband's character.

Personal life
Barrett was previously engaged to TV host and comedian Chris Hardwick before her marriage to American actor Gabriel Macht in 2004. The couple had their first child, a girl, in August 2007 in Los Angeles. They had a second child, a son in February 2014.

On 28 August 2009, Barrett was naturalized as a US citizen at the Los Angeles Convention Center. Barrett enjoys skydiving.

Filmography

Film

Television

References

External links

Australian expatriates in the United States
Australian female models
Australian film actresses
Australian television actresses
Living people
Actresses from Brisbane
The Real World (TV series) cast members
20th-century Australian actresses
21st-century Australian actresses
Alumni of the British American Drama Academy
Naturalized citizens of the United States
1972 births